Shuswap (Skwlax Field) Aerodrome  is located northeast of Chase, British Columbia, Canada.

References

Registered aerodromes in British Columbia